Béla Viktor János Bartók (25 March 1881 – 26 September 1945) was a Hungarian composer, pianist, and ethnomusicologist. He is considered one of the most important composers of the 20th century; he and Franz Liszt are regarded as Hungary's greatest composers. Through his collection and analytical study of folk music, he was one of the founders of comparative musicology, which later became ethnomusicology.

Biography

Childhood and early years (1881–98)
Bartók was born in the Banatian town of Nagyszentmiklós in the Kingdom of Hungary (present-day Sânnicolau Mare, Romania) on 25 March 1881. On his father's side, the Bartók family was a Hungarian lower noble family, originating from Borsodszirák, Borsod. His paternal grandmother was a Catholic of Bunjevci origin, but considered herself Hungarian. Bartók's father (1855–1888) was also named Béla. Bartók's mother, Paula (née Voit) (1857–1939), also spoke Hungarian fluently. A native of Turócszentmárton (present-day Martin, Slovakia), she also had Hungarian and Slovak ancestry.

Béla displayed notable musical talent very early in life: according to his mother, he could distinguish between different dance rhythms that she played on the piano before he learned to speak in complete sentences. By the age of four he was able to play 40 pieces on the piano and his mother began formally teaching him the next year.

In 1888, when he was seven, his father, the director of an agricultural school, died suddenly. His mother then took Béla and his sister, Erzsébet, to live in Nagyszőlős (present-day Vynohradiv, Ukraine) and then in Pressburg (Pozsony, present-day Bratislava, Slovakia). Béla gave his first public recital aged 11 in Nagyszőlős, to positive critical reception. Among the pieces he played was his own first composition, written two years previously: a short piece called "The Course of the Danube". Shortly thereafter, László Erkel accepted him as a pupil.

Early musical career (1899–1908)

From 1899 to 1903, Bartók studied piano under István Thomán, a former student of Franz Liszt, and composition under János Koessler at the Royal Academy of Music in Budapest. There he met Zoltán Kodály, who made a strong impression on him and became a lifelong friend and colleague. In 1903, Bartók wrote his first major orchestral work, Kossuth, a symphonic poem which honored Lajos Kossuth, hero of the Hungarian Revolution of 1848.

The music of Richard Strauss, whom he met in 1902 at the Budapest premiere of Also sprach Zarathustra, strongly influenced his early work. When visiting a holiday resort in the summer of 1904, Bartók overheard a young nanny, Lidi Dósa from Kibéd in Transylvania, sing folk songs to the children in her care. This sparked his lifelong dedication to folk music.

From 1907, he also began to be influenced by the French composer Claude Debussy, whose compositions Kodály had brought back from Paris. Bartók's large-scale orchestral works were still in the style of Johannes Brahms and Richard Strauss, but he wrote a number of small piano pieces which showed his growing interest in folk music. The first piece to show clear signs of this new interest is the String Quartet No. 1 in A minor (1908), which contains folk-like elements. He began teaching as a piano professor at the Liszt Academy of Music in Budapest. This position freed him from touring Europe as a pianist and enabled him to work in Hungary. Among his notable students were Fritz Reiner, Sir Georg Solti, György Sándor, Ernő Balogh, Gisela Selden-Goth, and Lili Kraus. After Bartók moved to the United States, he taught Jack Beeson and Violet Archer.

In 1908, he and Kodály traveled into the countryside to collect and research old Magyar folk melodies. Their growing interest in folk music coincided with a contemporary social interest in traditional national culture. Magyar folk music had previously been categorised as Gypsy music. The classic example is Franz Liszt's Hungarian Rhapsodies for piano, which he based on popular art songs performed by Romani bands of the time. In contrast, Bartók and Kodály discovered that the old Magyar folk melodies were based on pentatonic scales, similar to those in Asian folk traditions, such as those of Central Asia, Anatolia and Siberia.

Bartók and Kodály set about incorporating elements of such Magyar peasant music into their compositions. They both frequently quoted folk song melodies verbatim and wrote pieces derived entirely from authentic songs. An example is his two volumes entitled For Children for solo piano, containing 80 folk tunes to which he wrote accompaniment. Bartók's style in his art music compositions was a synthesis of folk music, classicism, and modernism. His melodic and harmonic sense was influenced by the folk music of Hungary, Romania, and other nations. He was especially fond of the asymmetrical dance rhythms and pungent harmonies found in Bulgarian music. Most of his early compositions offer a blend of nationalist and late Romanticism elements.

Middle years and career (1909–39)

Personal life
In 1909, at the age of 28, Bartók married Márta Ziegler (1893–1967), aged 16. Their son, Béla Bartók III, was born the next year. After nearly 15 years together, Bartók divorced Márta in June 1923. Two months after his divorce, he married Ditta Pásztory (1903–1982), a piano student, ten days after proposing to her. She was aged 19, he 42. Their son, Péter, was born in 1924.

Raised as a Catholic, by his early adulthood Bartók had become an atheist. He later became attracted to Unitarianism and publicly converted to the Unitarian faith in 1916. Although Bartók was not conventionally religious, according to his son Béla Bartók III, "he was a nature lover: he always mentioned the miraculous order of nature with great reverence." As an adult, Béla III later became lay president of the Hungarian Unitarian Church.

Opera
In 1911, Bartók wrote what was to be his only opera, Bluebeard's Castle, dedicated to Márta. He entered it for a prize by the Hungarian Fine Arts Commission, but they rejected his work as not fit for the stage. In 1917 Bartók revised the score for the 1918 première, and rewrote the ending. Following the 1919 revolution in which he actively participated, he was pressured by the Horthy regime to remove the name of librettist Béla Balázs from the opera, as Balázs was of Jewish origin, was blacklisted, and had left the country for Vienna. Bluebeard's Castle received only one revival, in 1936, before Bartók emigrated. For the remainder of his life, although devoted to Hungary, its people and its culture, he never felt much loyalty to the government or its official establishments.

Folk music and composition

After his disappointment over the Fine Arts Commission competition, Bartók wrote little for two or three years, preferring to concentrate on collecting and arranging folk music. He found the phonograph an essential tool for collecting folk music for its accuracy, objectivity, and manipulability. He collected first in the Carpathian Basin (then the Kingdom of Hungary), where he notated Hungarian, Slovak, Romanian, and Bulgarian folk music. The developmental breakthrough for Bartok arrived when he collaboratively collected folk music with Zoltán Kodály through the medium of an Edison machine on which they would study classification possibilities (for individual folk songs) and record hundreds of cylinders. Bartok's compositional command of folk elements is expressed in such an authentic and undiluted a manner because of the scales, sounds, and rhythms that were so much a part of his native Hungary that he automatically saw music in these terms. He also collected in Moldavia, Wallachia, and (in 1913) Algeria. The outbreak of World War I forced him to stop the expeditions, but he returned to composing with a ballet called The Wooden Prince (1914–16) and the String Quartet No. 2 in (1915–17), both influenced by Debussy.

Bartók's libretto for The Miraculous Mandarin, another ballet, was influenced by Igor Stravinsky, Arnold Schoenberg and Richard Strauss. Though started in 1918, the story's sexual content kept it from being performed until 1926. He next wrote his two violin sonatas (written in 1921 and 1922, respectively), which are among his most harmonically and structurally complex pieces.

In March 1927, he visited Barcelona and performed the Rhapsody for piano Sz.26 with the Orquestra Pau Casals at the Gran Teatre del Liceu. During the same stay, he attended a concert by the Cobla Barcelona at the Palau de la Música Catalana. According to the critic Joan Llongueras, “he was very interested in the sardanas, above all, the freshness, spontaneity and life of our music [...] he wanted to know the mechanism of the tenoras and the tibles, and requested data on the composition of the cobla and extension and characteristics of each instrument ”.

In 1927–28, Bartók wrote his Third and Fourth String Quartets, after which his compositions demonstrated his mature style. Notable examples of this period are Music for Strings, Percussion and Celesta (1936) and Divertimento for String Orchestra (1939). The Fifth String Quartet was composed in 1934, and the Sixth String Quartet (his last) in 1939. In 1936 he travelled to Turkey to collect and study Turkish folk music. He worked in collaboration with Turkish composer Ahmet Adnan Saygun mostly around Adana.

World War II and final years (1940–45)
In 1940, as the European political situation worsened after the outbreak of World War II, Bartók was increasingly tempted to flee Hungary. He strongly opposed the Nazis and Hungary's alliance with Germany and the Axis powers under the Tripartite Pact. After the Nazis came to power in 1933, Bartók refused to give concerts in Germany and broke away from his publisher there. His anti-fascist political views caused him a great deal of trouble with the establishment in Hungary. In his will recorded on 4 October 1940, he requested that no square or street be named after him until the Budapest squares Oktogon and Kodály körönd, or in fact any square or street in Hungary, no longer bear the names of Mussolini and Hitler, as they did at the time he wrote his will. Having first sent his manuscripts out of the country, Bartók reluctantly emigrated to the U.S. with his wife, Ditta Pásztory, in October 1940. They settled in New York City after arriving on the night of 29–30 October via a steamer from Lisbon. After joining them in 1942, their younger son, Péter Bartók, enlisted in the United States Navy where he served in the Pacific during the remainder of the war and later settled in Florida where he became a recording and sound engineer. His elder son, by his first marriage, Béla Bartók III, remained in Hungary and later worked as a railroad official until his retirement in the early 1980s.

Although he became an American citizen in 1945, shortly before his death, Bartók never felt fully at home in the United States. He initially found it difficult to compose. Although he was well known in America as a pianist, ethnomusicologist and teacher, he was not well known as a composer. There was little American interest in his music during his final years. He and his wife Ditta gave some concerts, although demand for them was low. Bartók, who had made some recordings in Hungary, also recorded for Columbia Records after he came to the US; many of these recordings (some with Bartók's own spoken introductions) were later issued on LP and CD.

Supported by a research fellowship from Columbia University, for several years, Bartók and Ditta worked on a large collection of Serbian and Croatian folk songs in Columbia's libraries. Bartók's economic difficulties during his first years in America were mitigated by publication royalties, teaching and performance tours. While his finances were always precarious, he did not live and die in poverty as was the common myth. He had enough friends and supporters to ensure that there was sufficient money and work available for him to live on. Bartók was a proud man and did not easily accept charity. Despite being short on cash at times, he often refused money that his friends offered him out of their own pockets. Although he was not a member of the ASCAP, the society paid for any medical care he needed during his last two years, to which Bartók reluctantly agreed. The first symptoms of his health problems began late in 1940, when his right shoulder began to show signs of stiffening. In 1942, symptoms increased and he started having bouts of fever. Bartók's illness was at first thought to be a recurrence of the tuberculosis he had experienced as a young man, and one of his doctors in New York was Edgar Mayer, director of Will Rogers Memorial Hospital in Saranac Lake but medical examinations found no underlying disease. Finally, in April 1944, leukemia was diagnosed, but by this time, little could be done.

As his body slowly failed, Bartók found more creative energy, and he produced a final set of masterpieces, partly thanks to the violinist Joseph Szigeti and the conductor Fritz Reiner (Reiner had been Bartók's friend and champion since his days as Bartók's student at the Royal Academy). Bartók's last work might well have been the String Quartet No. 6 but for Serge Koussevitzky's commission for the Concerto for Orchestra. Koussevitsky's Boston Symphony Orchestra premièred the work in December 1944 to highly positive reviews. The Concerto for Orchestra quickly became Bartók's most popular work, although he did not live to see its full impact.

In 1944, he was also commissioned by Yehudi Menuhin to write a Sonata for Solo Violin. In 1945, Bartók composed his Piano Concerto No. 3, a graceful and almost neo-classical work, as a surprise 42nd birthday present for Ditta, but he died just over a month before her birthday, with the scoring not quite finished. He had also sketched his Viola Concerto, but had barely started the scoring at his death, leaving completed only the viola part and sketches of the orchestral part.

Béla Bartók died at age 64 in a hospital in New York City from complications of leukemia (specifically, of secondary polycythemia) on 26 September 1945. His funeral was attended by only ten people. Aside from his widow and their son, other attendees included György Sándor.

Bartók's body was initially interred in Ferncliff Cemetery in Hartsdale, New York. During the final year of communist Hungary in the late 1980s, the Hungarian government, along with his two sons, Béla III and Péter, requested that his remains be exhumed and transferred back to Budapest for burial, where Hungary arranged a state funeral for him on 7 July 1988. He was re-interred at Budapest's Farkasréti Cemetery, next to the remains of Ditta, who died in 1982, one year after what would have been Béla Bartók's 100th birthday.

The two unfinished works were later completed by his pupil Tibor Serly. György Sándor was the soloist in the first performance of the Third Piano Concerto on 8 February 1946. Ditta Pásztory-Bartók later played and recorded it. The Viola Concerto was revised and published in the 1990s by Bartók's son; this version may be closer to what Bartók intended. Concurrently, Peter Bartók, in association with Argentinian musician Nelson Dellamaggiore, worked to reprint and revise past editions of the Third Piano Concerto.

Music

Bartók's music reflects two trends that dramatically changed the sound of music in the 20th century: the breakdown of the diatonic system of harmony that had served composers for the previous two hundred years; and the revival of nationalism as a source for musical inspiration, a trend that began with Mikhail Glinka and Antonín Dvořák in the last half of the 19th century. In his search for new forms of tonality, Bartók turned to Hungarian folk music, as well as to other folk music of the Carpathian Basin and even of Algeria and Turkey; in so doing he became influential in that stream of modernism which used indigenous music and techniques.

One characteristic style of music is his Night music, which he used mostly in slow movements of multi-movement ensemble or orchestral compositions in his mature period. It is characterised by "eerie dissonances providing a backdrop to sounds of nature and lonely melodies". An example is the third movement (Adagio) of his Music for Strings, Percussion and Celesta. His music can be grouped roughly in accordance with the different periods in his life.

Early years (1890–1902)
The works of Bartók's youth were written in a classical and early romantic style touched with influences of popular and romani
music. Between 1890 and 1894 (nine to 13 years of age) he wrote 31 piano pieces with corresponding opus numbers. Although most of these were simple dance pieces, in these early works Bartók began to tackle some more advanced forms, as in his ten-part programmatic A Duna folyása ("The Course of the Danube", 1890–94), which he played in his first public recital in 1892.

In Catholic grammar school Bartók took to studying the scores of composers "from Bach to Wagner", his compositions then advancing in style and taking on similarities to Schumann and Brahms. Following his matriculation into the Budapest Academy in 1890 he composed very little, though he began to work on exercises in orchestration and familiarized himself thoroughly with the operas of Wagner. In 1902 his creative energies were revitalized by the discovery of the music of Richard Strauss, whose tone poem Also sprach Zarathustra, according to Bartók, "stimulated the greatest enthusiasm in me; at last I saw the way that lay before me." Bartók also owned the score to A Hero's Life, which he transcribed for the piano and committed to memory.

New influences (1903–11)
Under the influence of Strauss, Bartók composed in 1903 Kossuth, a symphonic poem in ten tableaux on the subject of the 1848 Hungarian war of independence, reflecting the composers growing interest in musical nationalism. A year later he renewed his opus numbers with the Rhapsody for Piano and Orchestra serving as Opus 1. Driven by nationalistic fervor and a desire to transcend the influence of prior composers, Bartók began a lifelong devotion to folk music which was sparked by his overhearing nanny Lidi Dósa's singing of Transylvanian folk songs at a Hungarian resort in 1904. Bartók began to collect Magyar peasant melodies, later extending to the folk music of other peoples of the Carpathian Basin, Slovaks, Romanians, Rusyns, Serbs and Croatians. His compositional output would gradually prune away romantic elements in favour of an idiom that embodied folk music as intrinsic and essential to its style. Later in life he would have this to say on the incorporation of folk and art music:The question is, what are the ways in which peasant music is taken over and becomes transmuted into modern music? We may, for instance, take over a peasant melody unchanged or only slightly varied, write an accompaniment to it and possibly some opening and concluding phrases. This kind of work would show a certain analogy with Bach's treatment of chorales. ... Another method ... is the following: the composer does not make use of a real peasant melody but invents his own imitation of such melodies. There is no true difference between this method and the one described above. ... There is yet a third way ... Neither peasant melodies nor imitations of peasant melodies can be found in his music, but it is pervaded by the atmosphere of peasant music. In this case we may say, he has completely absorbed the idiom of peasant music which has become his musical mother tongue.

Bartók became first acquainted with Debussy's music in 1907 and regarded his music highly. In an interview in 1939 Bartók said
Debussy's great service to music was to reawaken among all musicians an awareness of harmony and its possibilities. In that, he was just as important as Beethoven, who revealed to us the possibilities of progressive form, or as Bach, who showed us the transcendent significance of counterpoint. Now, what I am always asking myself is this: is it possible to make a synthesis of these three great masters, a living synthesis that will be valid for our time?  Debussy's influence is present in the Fourteen Bagatelles (1908). These made Ferruccio Busoni exclaim "At last something truly new!". Until 1911, Bartók composed widely differing works which ranged from adherence to romantic-style, to folk song arrangements and to his modernist opera Bluebeard's Castle. The negative reception of his work led him to focus on folk music research after 1911 and abandon composition with the exception of folk music arrangements.

Inspiration and experimentation (1916–21)
His pessimistic attitude towards composing was lifted by the stormy and inspiring contact with Klára Gombossy in the summer of 1915. This interesting episode in Bartók's life remained hidden until it was researched by Denijs Dille between 1979 and 1989. Bartók started composing again, including the Suite for piano opus 14 (1916), and The Miraculous Mandarin (1918) and he completed The Wooden Prince (1917).

Bartók felt the result of World War I as a personal tragedy. Many regions he loved were severed from Hungary: Transylvania, the Banat (where he was born), and Bratislava (Pozsony) where his mother had lived. Additionally, the political relations between Hungary and other successor states to the Austro-Hungarian empire prohibited his folk music research outside of Hungary. Bartók also wrote the noteworthy Eight Improvisations on Hungarian Peasant Songs in 1920, and the sunny Dance Suite in 1923, the year of his second marriage.

"Synthesis of East and West" (1926–45)
In 1926, Bartók needed a significant piece for piano and orchestra with which he could tour in Europe and America. He was particularly inspired by American composer Henry Cowell's controversial use of intense tone clusters on the piano while touring western Europe. Bartók happened to be present at one of these concerts, and would later request Cowell's permission to use his technique without causing offence; which Cowell granted. In the preparation for writing his first Piano Concerto, he wrote his Sonata, Out of Doors, and Nine Little Pieces, all for solo piano, and all of which prominently utilize clusters. He increasingly found his own voice in his maturity. The style of his last period—named "Synthesis of East and West"—is hard to define let alone to put under one term. In his mature period, Bartók wrote relatively few works but most of them are large-scale compositions for large settings. Only his voice works have programmatic titles and his late works often adhere to classical forms.

Among Bartók's most important works are the six string quartets (1909, 1917, 1927, 1928, 1934, and 1939), the Cantata Profana (1930), which Bartók declared was the work he felt and professed to be his most personal "credo", the Music for Strings, Percussion and Celesta (1936), the Concerto for Orchestra (1943) and the Third Piano Concerto (1945). He made a lasting contribution to the literature for younger students: for his son Péter's music lessons, he composed Mikrokosmos, a six-volume collection of graded piano pieces.

Musical analysis

Paul Wilson lists as the most prominent characteristics of Bartók's music from late 1920s onwards the influence of the Carpathian basin and European art music, and his changing attitude toward (and use of) tonality, but without the use of the traditional harmonic functions associated with major and minor scales.

Although Bartók claimed in his writings that his music was always tonal, he rarely uses the chords or scales of tonality, and so the descriptive resources of tonal theory are of limited use. George  and Elliott  focus on alternative methods of signaling tonal centers, via axes of inversional symmetry. Others view Bartók's axes of symmetry in terms of atonal analytic protocols. Richard  argues that inversional symmetry is often a byproduct of another atonal procedure, the formation of chords from transpositionally related dyads. Atonal pitch-class theory also furnishes the resources for exploring polymodal chromaticism, projected sets, privileged patterns, and large set types used as source sets such as the equal tempered twelve tone aggregate, octatonic scale (and alpha chord), the diatonic and heptatonia secunda seven-note scales, and less often the whole tone scale and the primary pentatonic collection.

He rarely used the simple aggregate actively to shape musical structure, though there are notable examples such as the second theme from the first movement of his Second Violin Concerto, commenting that he "wanted to show Schoenberg that one can use all twelve tones and still remain tonal". More thoroughly, in the first eight measures of the last movement of his Second Quartet, all notes gradually gather with the twelfth (G) sounding for the first time on the last beat of measure 8, marking the end of the first section. The aggregate is partitioned in the opening of the Third String Quartet with C–D–D–E in the accompaniment (strings) while the remaining pitch classes are used in the melody (violin 1) and more often as 7–35 (diatonic or "white-key" collection) and 5–35 (pentatonic or "black-key" collection) such as in no. 6 of the Eight Improvisations. There, the primary theme is on the black keys in the left hand, while the right accompanies with triads from the white keys. In measures 50–51 in the third movement of the Fourth Quartet, the first violin and cello play black-key chords, while the second violin and viola play stepwise diatonic lines. On the other hand, from as early as the Suite for piano, Op. 14 (1914), he occasionally employed a form of serialism based on compound interval cycles, some of which are maximally distributed, multi-aggregate cycles. Ernő Lendvai analyses Bartók's works as being based on two opposing tonal systems, that of the acoustic scale and the axis system, as well as using the golden section as a structural principle.

Milton Babbitt, in his 1949 critique of Bartók's string quartets, criticized Bartók for using tonality and non-tonal methods unique to each piece. Babbitt noted that "Bartók's solution was a specific one, it cannot be duplicated". Bartók's use of "two organizational principles"—tonality for large scale relationships and the piece-specific method for moment to moment thematic elements—was a problem for Babbitt, who worried that the "highly attenuated tonality" requires extreme non-harmonic methods to create a feeling of closure.

Catalogues
The cataloguing of Bartók's works is somewhat complex. Bartók assigned opus numbers to his works three times, the last of these series ending with the Sonata for Violin and Piano No. 1, Op. 21 in 1921. He ended this practice because of the difficulty of distinguishing between original works and ethnographic arrangements, and between major and minor works. Since his death, three attempts—two full and one partial—have been made at cataloguing. The first, and still most widely used, is András Szőllősy's chronological Sz. numbers, from 1 to 121.  subsequently reorganised the juvenilia (Sz. 1–25) thematically, as DD numbers 1 to 77. The most recent catalogue is that of László Somfai; this is a chronological index with works identified by BB numbers 1 to 129, incorporating corrections based on the Béla Bartók Thematic Catalogue.

On 1 January 2016, Bartók's works entered the public domain in the European Union.

Discography
Together with his like-minded contemporary Zoltán Kodály, Bartók embarked on an extensive programme of field research to capture the folk and peasant melodies of Magyar, Slovak and Romanian language territories. At first they would transcribe the melodies by hand, but later they began to use a wax cylinder recording machine invented by Thomas Edison. Compilations of Bartók's field recordings, interviews, and original piano playing have been released over the years, largely by the Hungarian record label Hungaroton: 
 
 
 
 
 Bartók, Béla. 2003. Bartók Sonata for 2 Pianos & Percussion, Suite for 2 Pianos.  Apex 0927-49569-2. CD recording.
 
 
 
A compilation of field recordings and transcriptions for two violas was also recently released by Tantara Records in 2014.

On 18 March 2016 Decca Classics released Béla Bartók: The Complete Works, the first ever complete compilation of all of Bartók's compositions, including new recordings of never-before-recorded early piano and vocal works. However, none of the composer's own performances are included in this 32-disc set.

Statues

 A statue of Bartók stands in Brussels, Belgium, near the central train station in a public square, Spanjeplein-Place d'Espagne.
 A statue stands outside Malvern Court, London, south of the South Kensington tube station, and just north of Sydney Place. An English Heritage blue plaque, unveiled in 1997, now commemorates Bartók at 7 Sydney Place,  where he stayed when performing in London.
 A statue of him was installed in front of the house in which Bartók spent his last eight years in Hungary, at Csalán út 29, in the hills above Budapest. It is now operated as the Béla Bartók Memorial House (Bartók Béla Emlékház). Copies of this statue also stand in Makó (the closest Hungarian city to his birthplace, which is now in Romania), Paris, London and Toronto.
 A bust and plaque located at his last residence, in New York City at 309 W. 57th Street, inscribed: "The Great Hungarian Composer / Béla Bartók / (1881–1945) / Made His Home In This House / During the Last Year of His Life".
 A bust of him is located in the front yard of Ankara State Conservatory, Ankara, Turkey, next to the bust of Ahmet Adnan Saygun.
 A bronze statue of Bartók, sculpted by Imre Varga in 2005, stands in the front lobby of The Royal Conservatory of Music, 273 Bloor Street West, Toronto, Ontario, Canada.
 Also to be noted, in the same park, a sculptural transcription of the composer's research on tonal harmony, the fountain/sculpture Cristaux designed by Jean-Yves Lechevallier in 1980.
 A statue of him also stands in the city centre of Târgu Mureș, Romania. ( Google Maps Márton Izsák )
 A statue (seated) of Bartók is also situated in front of Nako Castle, in his hometown, Nagyszentmiklós.

References

Citations

Sources

Further reading

 
 2003. "Béla Bartók 1881–1945". Websophia.com. (Accessed 25 March 2009)
 Bartók, Béla. 1976. "The Influence of Peasant Music on Modern Music (1931)". In Béla Bartók Essays, edited by Benjamin Suchoff, 340–44. London: Faber & Faber.  
 Bartók, Béla. 1981. The Hungarian Folk Song, second English edition, edited by Benjamin Suchoff, translated by Michel D. Calvocoressi, with annotations by Zoltán Kodály. The New York Bartók Archive Studies in Musicology 13. Albany: State University of New York Press. 
 Bartók, Peter. 2002. "My Father". Homosassa, Florida, Bartók Records.
 Bayley, Amanda (ed.). 2001. The Cambridge Companion to Bartók. Cambridge Companions to Music. Cambridge and New York: Cambridge University Press.  (cloth);  (pbk). 
 Bónis, Ferenc. 2006. Élet-képek: Bartók Béla. Budapest: Balassi Kiadó: Vávi Kft., Alföldi Nyomda Zrt. .
 Boys, Henry. 1945. "Béla Bartók 1881–1945". The Musical Times 86, no. 1233 (November): 329–31.
 Cohn, Richard, 1992. "Bartók's Octatonic Strategies: A Motivic Approach." Journal of the American Musicological Society 44
 Czeizel, Endre. 1992. Családfa: honnan jövünk, mik vagyunk, hová megyünk? [Budapest]: Kossuth Könyvkiadó. 
 Decca. 2016. "Béla Bartók: Complete Works: Int. Release 18 Mar. 2016: 32 CDs, 0289 478 9311 0". Welcome to Decca Classics: Catalogue, www.deccaclassics.com (accessed 19 August 2016).
 Fassett, Agatha, 1958. The Naked Face of Genius: Béla Bartók's American Years. Boston: Houghton Mifflin.
 Jyrkiäinen, Reijo. 2012. "Form, Monothematicism, Variation and Symmetry in Béla Bartók's String Quartets". Ph.D. diss. Helsinki: University of Helsinki.  (Abstract).
 Kárpáti, János. 1975. Bartók's String Quartets, translated by Fred MacNicol. Budapest: Corvina Press.
 Kasparov, Andrey. 2000. "Third Piano Concerto in the Revised 1994 Edition: Newly Discovered Corrections by the Composer". Hungarian Music Quarterly 11, nos. 3–4:2–11.
 Leafstedt, Carl S. 1999. Inside Bluebeard's Castle. New York: Oxford University Press. 
 Lendvai, Ernő. 1972. "Einführung in die Formen- und Harmoniewelt Bartóks" (1953). In his Béla Bartók: Weg und Werk, edited by Bence Szabolcsi, 105–49. Kassel: Bärenreiter.
 Loxdale, Hugh D., and Adalbert Balog. 2009. "Béla Bartók: Musician, Musicologist, Composer, and Entomologist!." Antenna – Bulletin of the Royal Entomological Society of London 33, no. 4:175–82.
 Maconie, Robin. 2005. Other Planets: The Music of Karlheinz Stockhausen. Lanham, MD, Toronto, Oxford: The Scarecrow Press, Inc. .
 Martins, José Oliveira. 2015. "Bartók's Polymodality: the Dasian and other Affinity Spaces". Journal of Music Theory 59, no. 2 (October): 273–320. 
 Móser, Zoltán. 2006b. "Bartók-õsök Gömörben". Honismeret: A Honismereti Szövetség folyóirata  34, no. 2 (April): 9–11.
 Nelson, David Taylor (2012). "Béla Bartók: The Father of Ethnomusicology", Musical Offerings: Vol. 3: No. 2, Article 2.
 Sluder, Claude K. 1994. "Revised Bartók Composition Highlights Pro Musica Concert". The Republic (16 February).
 Smith, Erik. 1965. A discussion between István Kertész and the producer. DECCA Records (liner notes for Bluebeard's Castle).
 Somfai, László. 1981. Tizennyolc Bartók-tanulmány [Eighteen Bartók Studies]. Budapest: Zeneműkiadó. .
 Wells, John C. 1990. "Bartók", in Longman Pronunciation Dictionary, 63. Harlow, England: Longman.

External links

 
 Bartók Béla Memorial House, Budapest 
 The Belgian Bartók Archives, housed in the Brussels Royal Library and founded by Denijs Dille 
 
 Gallery of Bartók portraits
 Virtual Exhibition on Bartók
 Finding aid to Béla Bartók manuscripts at Columbia University. Rare Book & Manuscript Library.

 
 Bartók plays Bartók for Don Gabor's Continental record label later reissued on Remington Records
 Interactive scores of Bartók’s works for piano with Sir András Schiff.

 
1881 births
1945 deaths
20th-century classical composers
20th-century Hungarian musicians
20th-century Hungarian male musicians
20th-century musicologists
Anton Rubinstein Competition prize-winners
Ballet composers
Burials at Farkasréti Cemetery
Burials at Ferncliff Cemetery
Columbia University faculty
Composers for piano
Deaths from cancer in New York (state)
Deaths from leukemia
Former Roman Catholics
Franz Liszt Academy of Music alumni
Academic staff of the Franz Liszt Academy of Music
Columbia University people
Hungarian atheists
Hungarian classical composers
Hungarian classical pianists
Hungarian emigrants to the United States
Hungarian ethnomusicologists
Hungarian folk-song collectors
Hungarian male classical composers
Hungarian music educators
Hungarian opera composers
Hungarian people of Croatian descent
Hungarian people of German descent
Hungarian refugees
Hungarian Roman Catholics
Hungarian song collectors
Hungarian Unitarians
Male classical pianists
Male opera composers
Members of the Hungarian Academy of Sciences
Members of the Romanian Academy elected posthumously
Modernist composers
People from Sânnicolau Mare
People from Saranac Lake, New York
Pupils of Hans von Koessler
Pupils of István Thomán
String quartet composers
Composers for viola